Coonoor is a small hill station in the Indian state of Tamil Nadu and has featured in numerous Bollywood films.  Notable films shot in Coonoor include:

  Deewana
 Saajan
 Kapoor & Sons
 Golmaal Again
 Main Tera Hero
 Dhruva Natchathiram
 Sadma
 Ateet

References 

Films shot in Coonoor